Cobi Hamilton (born November 13, 1990) is a former American football wide receiver. He played college football at Arkansas. He was considered one of the top wide receiver prospects for the 2013 NFL Draft, and was drafted by the Cincinnati Bengals in the sixth round of the draft.

Hamilton has also been a member of the Philadelphia Eagles, Miami Dolphins, Carolina Panthers, Pittsburgh Steelers, Houston Texans, Arizona Cardinals, and Indianapolis Colts.

Early years
Hamilton attended  Texas High School in Texarkana, Texas, where he set the Tigers’ single-season receiving yardage record as a senior with 64 receptions for 1,071 yards and 14 touchdowns. He was all-district and all-area in his career and he was named the All-Northeast Texas Offensive Player of the Year. As a junior, he had 29 receptions for 726 yards and seven touchdowns. He was a high school teammate of former Arkansas quarterback Ryan Mallett.

Hamilton was also a standout athlete for the Texas High School track team. He finished fourth in the 200 meters at the AAU National Junior Olympics, with a time of 21.41 seconds. He finished 4th in the 100 meters at the 2009 Region II-4A Championships, with a career-best time of 10.60 seconds. He also ran for the Arkansas track team. He ran a personal best of 21.09 in the 200 meter.

Considered a three-star recruit by Rivals.com, he was rated the No.63 wide receiver in the nation. He accepted a scholarship offer from Arkansas over offers from Missouri, Oklahoma State and Texas.

College career

Hamilton attended the University of Arkansas from 2009 to 2012. As a senior, he was an All-SEC selection after recording 90 receptions for 1,335 yards and five touchdowns. The receptions and yards were school records. On September 22, 2012, he set an SEC record for receiving yards in a game with 303. He finished his career with 175 receptions for 2,854 yards and 18 touchdowns.

Professional career

Cincinnati Bengals
Hamilton was selected by the Cincinnati Bengals in the sixth round (197th overall) of the 2013 NFL Draft. On May 10, 2013, the Bengals signed him to a four-year, $2.25 million contract. Hamilton was on the Bengals' practice squad for the entirety of his rookie season. He started his second season on the Bengals' practice squad.

Philadelphia Eagles
On September 10, 2014, Hamilton was signed to the Philadelphia Eagles practice squad.

On October 6, 2014, the Philadelphia Eagles released Hamilton.

Cincinnati Bengals (second stint)
On October 13, 2014, the Cincinnati Bengals resigned Hamilton. On December 24, 2014, he was promoted to the 53-man roster. On July 30, 2015, he was waived by the Bengals.

Miami Dolphins
On August 1, 2015, Hamilton was claimed off waivers by the Miami Dolphins. On September 5, 2015, he was released by the Dolphins.

Carolina Panthers
The Carolina Panthers signed Hamilton to a futures contract on January 12, 2016. On July 25, 2016, Hamilton was released by the Panthers.

Pittsburgh Steelers
On August 5, 2016, the Pittsburgh Steelers signed Hamilton to a one-year, $460,000 contract. On September 3, 2016, he was released by the Steelers as part of final roster cuts. The next day he was signed to the Steeler's practice squad. He was promoted to the active roster on October 15, 2016, and a day later, caught a 23-yard touchdown pass from Ben Roethlisberger, his first in the NFL, during a 15-30 loss to the Miami Dolphins. It was his first career start and he finished with two receptions for 36 receiving yards and a touchdown. The following week, he earned his second consecutive start and caught three passes for 36 receiving yards in a 16-27 loss to the New England Patriots. In the season finale against the Cleveland Browns, he caught the game-winning touchdown on a 26-yard pass from Landry Jones to win in overtime and finished the game with three receptions for 54 receiving yards and a touchdown. Hamilton was the Pittsburgh Steeler's sixth wide receiver on their depth chart throughout the season, behind Antonio Brown, Markus Wheaton, Sammie Coates, Darrius Heyward-Bey, and Eli Rogers. He finished the season with 17 receptions, 234 receiving yards, and two touchdowns in 11 games. Hamilton also had five kick returns for 83-yards and made one tackle on kickoff coverage.

On January 26, 2017, Hamilton was re-signed to a one-year deal by the Steelers. Hamilton entered training camp in  competing with Sammie Coates, JuJu Smith-Schuster, Justin Hunter, Marcus Tucker, Eli Rogers, and Darrius Heyward-Bey for a backup wide receiver position. On September 2, 2017, Hamilton was waived by the Steelers.

Houston Texans
On September 18, 2017, Hamilton was signed to the Houston Texans' practice squad. He was promoted to the active roster on November 22, 2017.

On March 21, 2018, Hamilton was waived by the Texans.

Arizona Cardinals
On March 22, 2018, Hamilton was claimed off waivers by the Arizona Cardinals. He was waived on June 14, 2018.

Indianapolis Colts
On August 20, 2018, Hamilton signed with the Indianapolis Colts. He was waived on September 1, 2018.

References

External links
Arkansas Razorbacks bio

1990 births
Living people
People from Texarkana, Texas
Players of American football from Texas
American football wide receivers
Arkansas Razorbacks football players
Cincinnati Bengals players
Miami Dolphins players
Philadelphia Eagles players
Carolina Panthers players
Pittsburgh Steelers players
Houston Texans players
Arizona Cardinals players
Indianapolis Colts players